St. Louis is located at .

Much of the area is a fertile and gently rolling prairie that features low hills and broad, shallow valleys. Both the Mississippi River and the Missouri River have cut large valleys with wide flood plains.

Limestone and dolomite of the Mississippian epoch underlies the area and much of the city is a karst area, with numerous sinkholes and caves, although most of the caves have been sealed shut; many springs are visible along the riverfront. Significant deposits of coal, brick clay, and millerite ore were once mined in the city, and the predominant surface rock, the St. Louis Limestone, is used as dimension stone and rubble for construction.

The St. Louis Geologic fault is exposed along the bluffs and was the source of several historic minor earthquakes; it is part of the St. Louis Anticline which has some petroleum and natural gas deposits outside of the city. St. Louis is also just north of the New Madrid Seismic Zone which in 1811–12 produced a series of earthquakes that are the largest known in the contiguous United States. Seismologists estimate 90% probability of a magnitude 6.0 earthquake by 2040 and 7-10% probability of a magnitude 8.0, such tremors could create significant damage across a large region of the central U.S. including St. Louis.

Near the southern boundary of the City of St. Louis (separating it from St. Louis County) is the River des Peres, virtually the only river or stream within the city limits that is not entirely underground. Most of River des Peres was either channelized or put underground in the 1920s and early 1930s. The lower section of the river was the site of some of the worst flooding of the Great Flood of 1993.

Near the central, western boundary of the city is Forest Park, site of the 1904 World's fair, the Louisiana Purchase Exposition of 1904, and the 1904 Summer Olympics, the first Olympic Games held in North America. At the time, St. Louis was the fourth most populous city in the United States.

The Missouri River forms the northern border of St. Louis County, exclusive of a few areas where the river has changed its course. The Meramec River forms most of its southern border. To the east is the City and the Mississippi River.

According to the United States Census Bureau, the city has a total area of 171.3 km² (66.2 mi²). 160.4 km² (61.9 mi²) of it is land and 11.0 km² (4.2 mi² or 6.39%) of it is water.

Metropolitan statistical area

The St. Louis Metropolitan Statistical Area is the 19th largest by population in the United States, with 2,813,912 as of 2008. It includes St. Louis County (991,830), the independent City of St. Louis (319,294), the Missouri counties of Saint Charles (360,485), Jefferson (217,679), Franklin (100,898), Lincoln (52,775) and Warren (31,214), and the Illinois counties of Madison (267,038), Saint Clair (261,409), Macoupin (48,143), Clinton (36,470), Monroe (32,335), Jersey (22,451), Bond (18,253), and Calhoun (5,101).

Cityscape

The city is divided into 79 neighborhoods. The divisions have no legal standing, although some neighborhood associations administer grants or hold veto power over historic-district development. Nevertheless, the social and political influence of neighborhood identity is profound. Some hold avenues of massive stone edifices built as palaces for heads of state visiting the 1904 World's Fair. Others offer tidy working-class bungalows, loft districts, or areas hard-hit by social problems and unemployment. Many of them have retained - quite consciously and deliberately - a camaraderie that is missing from many American towns today.

Among the best-known, architecturally significant, or well-visited neighborhoods are Downtown, Midtown, Benton Park, Carondelet, the Central West End, Clayton/Tamm (Dogtown), Dutchtown South, Forest Park Southeast, Grand Center, The Hill, Lafayette Square, Shaw (home to the Missouri Botanical Garden and named after the Garden's founder, Henry Shaw), Southwest Garden, Soulard, Tower Grove East, Tower Grove South, Hortense Place and Wydown/Skinker.

Climate

The climate is humid subtropical (Köppen: Cfa), but all around Greater St. Louis has a humid continental climate (Dfa) through the USA isoterm, with a winter that sustains in the coldest month temperatures below 0 ° C more easily, clear evidence of an urban heat island, which in the future may cover an even larger area and agglutinate cities and villages to the south. With neither large mountains nor large bodies of water to moderate its temperature, it is subject to both cold Arctic air and hot, humid tropical air from the Gulf of Mexico. The city has four distinct seasons. Spring is the wettest season and produces severe weather ranging from tornadoes to winter storms. The average window for such temperatures is May 19 thru September 14.

Fall is mild with lower humidity and can produce intermittent bouts of heavy rainfall with the first freeze of the season on average falling on November 2 (the last on average falls on April 3); the first measurable snow, often not counting flurries, on average occurs on December 4 (the last on average falls on March 17). Winters can be cold and snowy with temperatures frequently below freezing. Winter storm systems, such as Alberta clippers and Panhandle hooks, can bring days of heavy freezing rain, ice pellets, and snowfall.

Both  and  temperatures can be seen on an average 2 or 3 days per year. Average annual temperatures are "about 3 degrees warmer" overall than they were in the 1920s.

Winter (December through February) is the driest season, with an average  of precipitation. Dry spells lasting one to two weeks are common during the growing seasons.

St. Louis experiences thunderstorms 48 days a year on average. Especially in the spring, these storms can often be severe, with high winds, large hail and tornadoes. Lying within the hotbed of Tornado Alley, St. Louis reigns as one of the most frequently tornadic metropolitan areas, and has an extensive history of particularly damaging tornadoes. Severe flooding, such as the Great Flood of 1993, may occur in spring and summer; the (often rapid) melting of thick snow cover upstream either the Missouri or Mississippi Rivers can contribute to springtime flooding.

Some late autumns feature the warm weather known as Indian summer; some years see roses in bloom as late as early December.

Flora and fauna
Before the founding of the city, the area was prairie and open forest maintained by burning by Native Americans. Trees are mainly oak, maple, and hickory, similar to the forests of the nearby Ozarks; common understory trees include eastern redbud, serviceberry, and flowering dogwood. Riparian areas are forested with mainly American sycamore. Most of the residential area of the city is planted with large native shade trees. The largest native forest area is found in Forest Park. In autumn, the changing color of the trees is notable. Most species here are typical of the Eastern Woodland, although numerous decorative non-native species are found; the most notable invasive species is Japanese honeysuckle, which is actively removed from some parks.

Large mammals found in the city include urbanized coyotes and occasionally a stray whitetail deer. Eastern gray squirrel, cottontail rabbit, and other rodents are abundant, as well as the nocturnal and rarely seen opossum. Groundhogs are a common sight along the Mississippi River, and beaver are also seen. Large bird species are abundant in parks and include Canada goose, mallard duck, as well as shorebirds, including the great egret and great blue heron. Gulls are common along the Mississippi River; these species typically follow barge traffic. Large flocks of feral pigeons make their home at the Eads Bridge and MLK Bridge.  Winter populations of bald eagles are found by the Mississippi River around the Chain of Rocks Bridge. The city is on the Mississippi Flyway, used by migrating birds, and has a large variety of small bird species, common to the eastern U.S. The Eurasian tree sparrow, an introduced species, is limited in North America to the counties surrounding St. Louis. Tower Grove Park is a well-known birdwatching area in the city.

Frogs are commonly found in the springtime, especially after extensive wet periods. Common species include the American toad and species of chorus frogs, commonly called "spring peepers" that are found in nearly every pond. Some years have outbreaks of cicadas or ladybugs. Mosquitos and houseflies are common insect nuisances; because of this, windows are nearly universally fitted with screens, and "screened-in" porches are common in homes of the area. Populations of honey bees have sharply declined in recent years, and numerous species of pollinator insects have filled their ecological niche.

Adjacent communities
The following communities border the city of St. Louis directly:
 Cahokia, Illinois
 East Carondelet, Illinois
 East St. Louis, Illinois
 Madison, Illinois
 Sauget, Illinois
 Bellefontaine Neighbors, Missouri
 Clayton, Missouri
 Glasgow Village, Missouri
 Hillsdale, Missouri
 Jennings, Missouri Lemay, Missouri
 Mackenzie, Missouri
 Maplewood, Missouri
 Pine Lawn, Missouri
 Richmond Heights, Missouri
 Riverview, Missouri
 Shrewsbury, Missouri
 Spanish Lake, Missouri
 University City, Missouri
 Wellston, Missouri

In addition to the above named places, there are unincorporated parts of Madison County, Illinois; St. Clair County, Illinois; and St. Louis County, Missouri which border St. Louis. The Illinois communities of Brooklyn and Venice lie across the Mississippi River, but do not border St. Louis because the river itself is not part of their territory.

See also
Climate of Missouri

References